The 1996–97 Fussball Club Basel 1893 season was their 104th season since the club's foundation. Peter Epting retired from the chairmanship and René C. Jäggi became the club's new chairman following the AGM which was held in November. FC Basel played their home games in the St. Jakob Stadium. Following their promotion in the 1993–94 season this was their third consecutive season in the highest tier of Swiss football.

Overview

Pre-season
Karl Engel was trainer at the start of the season, but he was replaced by Heinz Hermann in March 1997. Hermann only remained manager for a few weeks and was replaced by Salvatore Andracchio (ad interim) until the end of the season. The clubs priority aim was to remain in the top flight of Swiss football. 

A number of players had left the club during the off-season, Ike Shorunmu transferred to Zürich, Mario Cantaluppi moved to Servette and Gabriel Okolosi to Young Boys. Both Davide Orlando and Alexandre Rey moved back to Sion. Further players who left the club were Marco Walker, who moved to German team 1860 Munich, Lars Olsen returned to Denmark and joined Brøndby and Andre Meier moved on to FC Schaffhausen. To balance this, the club made some new signings as the season started. Adrian Knup returned to the club, signed in after a short spell by Galatasaray. Other players who joined from foreign clubs were, Adrian Falub who came from Universitatea Cluj and Mariano Armentano from Racing Club. A number of players also transferred from the domestic league, Gaetano Giallanza and Jean-Pierre La Placa both signed in from Sion, Mario Frick came from St. Gallen and Yann Poulard signed in from SR Delémont.

Domestic league
The season did not start too well, it took until the twelfth round until the team recorded their third victory and one of these three was a forfeit victory  because YB had used an unqualified player, Erol Bekirovski, in the match in the fourth round. As the first half of the season came to an end, the team had gathered five victories, ten draws and had suffered seven defeats in which the team scored 32 goals and conceded 33. Gaetano Giallanza was the team's top scorer with nine goals and Mario Frick was second best with six goals. Basel were in eighth position in the league table, thus, they qualified for the Championship round. 

During the winter break Markus Schupp signed in on loan from Hamburger SV, Franco Foda signed in from VfB Stuttgart and Fabrice Henry signed in from CD Toledo. Also during the winter break Admir Smajić transferred out to Young Boys. In the Championship round the team suffered six defeats in a row. During this period head-coach Karl Engel was fired and was replaced by Heinz Hermann. The football did not improve and after just a few weeks Hermann was replaced by Salvatore Andracchio. Basel ended the championship round with nine defeats in twelve games. They had won only three games and so they ended the group in the last position in the league table. The team scored just 16 goals and had conceded 28. Gaetano Giallanza was the team's top scorer, he had netted eight times in this stage.

Swiss Cup
Basel entered the Swiss Cup in the third principal round. The opponent here was lower tier FC Münsingen. Basel won the match after extra time. In the fourth round hosted the game against Young Boys and won 2–1. Oumar Kondé and Jean-Pierre La Placa each scored a goal and turned the game, after the team had been a goal behind early in the match. In the round of 16 Basel hosted Servette but they were knocked out, losing 1–4. The cup final was played between Sion and Luzern and ended with three all draw after extra time. Sion won the penalty shoot out and won the trophy. Because Sion won the double, as Swiss champions, they were qualified for the 1997–98 Champions League. Therefore, as finalists Luzern qualified to the 1997–98 Cup Winners' Cup.

UEFA Intertoto Cup
In the 1996 UEFA Intertoto Cup Basel played in group 7 together with Rotor Volgograd, Antalyaspor, Shakhtar Donetsk and Ataka-Aura Minsk. Basel won in Turkey against Antalyaspor and at home in the St. Jakob Stadium against Minsk. They drew at home with Shakhtar, but lost the in Russia against Volgograd who ended at the top of the group and continued to the next round. Basel ended the competition as second-placed team in the group league table.

Players 

The following is the list of the Basel first team squad. It also includes players that were in the squad the day the season started on 10 July 1996 but subsequently left the club after that date.

 

 

 
 

 

 

 

 

 

 
 

Players who left the squad

Results 
Legend

Friendly matches

Pre- and mid-season

Winter break

Nationalliga A

Qualifying phase

League table

Championship group

League table

Swiss Cup

Intertoto Cup

Group 7 matches

Group 7 table

See also
 History of FC Basel
 List of FC Basel players
 List of FC Basel seasons

References

Sources
 Rotblau: Jahrbuch Saison 2015/2016. Publisher: FC Basel Marketing AG. 
 Die ersten 125 Jahre / 2018. Publisher: Josef Zindel im Friedrich Reinhardt Verlag, Basel. 
 1996–97 Verein "Basler Fussballarchiv” homepage
 FCB squad 1996–97 at Joggeli.ch
 1996–97 at RSSSF

External links
 FC Basel official site

FC Basel seasons
Basel